Marita Golden (born April 28, 1950) is an American novelist, nonfiction writer, professor, and co-founder of the Hurston/Wright Foundation, a national organization that serves as a resource center for African-American writers.

Background and career
Marita Golden was born in Washington, D.C., in 1950 and attended the city’s public schools. She received a B.A. degree in American Studies and English from American University and a M.SC. in Journalism from Columbia University. After graduating from Columbia, she worked in publishing and began a career as a freelance writer, writing feature articles for many magazines and newspapers including Essence Magazine, The New York Times, and The Washington Post.

Golden's first book, Migrations of the Heart (1983), was a memoir based on her experiences coming of age during the 1960s and her political activism as well as her marriage to a Nigerian and her life in Nigeria, where she lived for four years.

She has taught at many colleges and universities, including the University of Lagos in Lagos, Nigeria, Roxbury Community College, Emerson College, American University, George Mason University, and Virginia Commonwealth University. She holds the position of Writer in Residence at the University of the District of Columbia, in Washington, D.C. She has held previous Writer-in-Residence positions at Brandeis University, University of the District of Columbia, Hampton University, Simmons College, Columbia College, William and Mary, Old Dominion University and Howard University.

As a literary activist, she co-founded the Washington, D.C.-based African-American Writers Guild, as well as the Hurston/Wright Foundation, named in honor of Zora Neale Hurston and Richard Wright, which serves the national and international community of Black writers and administers the Hurston-Wright Legacy Award.

Works

Novels
A Woman's Place (1986)
Long Distance Life (1989)
And Do Remember Me (1992)
The Edge of Heaven (1999)
After (2006)
The Wide Circumference of Love (2017)

Nonfiction
Migrations of the Heart (1983)

A Miracle Everyday: Triumph and Transformation in the Lives of Single Mothers (1999)
Saving Our Sons Raising Black Children in a Turbulent World (1994)

Anthologies
Daughters of Africa: An International Anthology of Words and Writings by Women of African Descent (1992, ed. Margaret Busby)
Wild Women Don't Wear No Blues: Black Women Writers on Love, Men and Sex (1993)

Gumbo: A Celebration of African American Writing (2002)
It's All Love: Black Writers on Soul Mates Family and Friends (2009)

Awards
2018: NAACP Image Award nominee for Outstanding Literary Work – Fiction (her second nomination)
2008: Maryland Author Award from the Association of Maryland Librarians
2007: Award for Fiction from the Black Caucus of the American Library Association (for her novel After)
2002: Distinguished Service Award from the Authors Guild
2001: Barnes & Noble Writers for Writers Award presented by Poets & Writers
Inducted into the International Literary Hall of Fame of Writers of African Descent at the Gwendolyn Brooks Center at Chicago State University
Honorary Doctorate from the University of Richmond
Woman of the Year Award from Zeta Phi Beta
Distinguished Alumni Award from American University

References

External links
Marita Golden's official website.
Works by or about Marita Golden in libraries (WorldCat catalog)

1950 births
20th-century African-American women writers
20th-century African-American writers
20th-century American women writers
20th-century American writers
21st-century African-American women writers
21st-century African-American writers
21st-century American women writers
21st-century American writers
African-American academics
American expatriates in Nigeria
American University alumni
American University faculty and staff
American women academics
Columbia University Graduate School of Journalism alumni
George Mason University faculty
Living people
Academic staff of the University of Lagos
University of the District of Columbia faculty
Virginia Commonwealth University faculty
Writers from Washington, D.C.